Sabev (shortened from the male given name Sabotin which may be derived from събота meaning "Saturday") is a Bulgarian masculine surname – its feminine counterpart being Sabeva – and may refer to:
Aleksandar Sabev (born 1988), Bulgarian footballer
Mitko Sabev (born 1961), Bulgarian businessman

Bulgarian-language surnames